Goldsands Road Pit is a  geological Site of Special Scientific Interest in Southminster in Essex. It is a Geological Conservation Review site.

This site provides the earliest evidence of an ancient course of the combined Thames and Medway rivers, which flowed north-east across eastern Essex in the late Anglian period around 400,000 years ago.

The site is on private land with no public access.

References 

Sites of Special Scientific Interest in Essex
Geological Conservation Review sites
Southminster